Originally the gas flow computer was a mechanical (1920s technology) or later a pneumatic or hydraulic computing module (1940s technology used to the early 1990s but still available from a number of suppliers), subsequently superseded in most applications by an electronic module, as the primary elements switched from transmitting the measured variables from pneumatic or hydraulic pressure signals to electric current as explosion-proof (1960s technology to present)) and then intrinsically safe (1970s to present) transmitters (with low-power transistor circuitry) became available, that simply provided a dedicated gas flow computer function. 
Today "gas flow computers" as such have become uncommon, since gas flow computing is a subfunction of a data acquisition and control program implemented with programmable logic controller (PLCs) and remote terminal unit (RTUs); with the rise of smart transmitters in the early 1980s, these functions have also been incorporated within the field transmitters themselves.

The "gas flow computer" senses a mixed "dry" gas stream flow rate plus gas temperature and pressure. The most common method of measuring gas flow is via differential pressure across an orifice plate inserted into a flow metering pipe.

As the differential pressure is not directly proportional to the gas flow rate, a flow computer algorithm is required to convert the differential pressure reading into a flow rate (may include square root extraction to linearize the input). Since gas is compressible and affected by temperature, the gas temperature and pressure must also be monitored and compared to a specified standard temperature and pressure within the algorithm. This is referred to as volumetric flow measurement.

Next we need to calculate mass flow AGA3 based upon the specific gravity of the gas. Since a natural gas stream contains a mix of various hydrocarbon gases of different specific gravities, mole percentages must be determined via a gas sample analysis. The mixed gas stream will also contain some inert gases such as nitrogen and carbon dioxide. Therefore the gas flow computer also requires the entry of mole percentages for each gas component.

Based on accurate mass flow calculations it becomes possible, based upon the energy content of each gas component, to calculate energy flow, i.e., API 14.5 (GPA 2172) since each gas component contains different energy content. These values in joules (or calories or Btus) are typically built into the gas flow computer algorithm. Therefore energy flow metering is our ultimate goal since this is where the true value is for the client.  Also these mineral reserves are taxed based upon energy content. The inert gases such as nitrogen have no value.  (Some inert gases actually have negative value, most notably carbon dioxide and hydrogen sulphide, as they require extra equipment to remove from the natural gas, and costs are incurred in their disposal.)

Other input parameters include contract hour as well as location latitude and altitude above sea level, isentropic exponent and type of materials used in the metering device to optimize the accuracy of calculations. In summary the gas flow computer requires approximately 30 initial input parameters in conjunction with "near realtime" gas flow, pressure and temperature sensing.

In addition to providing volumetric, mass and energy flow data, the gas flow computer also provides date and time, instantaneous, hourly and daily data. The gas flow computer typically stores date/time stamped volume records in RAM for up to 35 days in order to provide sufficient time for a host system to retrieve the records as well as to allow time for human intervention if this retrieval fails to occur.  The flow computer generally tracks modifications to flow parameters (e.g. orifice plate size or gas analysis data) in an "Audit Trail" that identifies the modified parameter, the time and date of the value change, the old and new values, and may identify the person making the change.  The data log format and contents vary slightly by flow computer manufacturer, with all manufacturers designing to a specification outlined by the American Petroleum Institute.

Flow metering accuracy is easily compromised if there are liquids in the gas stream. Therefore methods are implemented to remove liquids from the gas stream before measurement. However a newer V-Cone technology (the inverse of orifice plate technology) is being used to more accurately meter gas that contains some liquids.

See also
AGA-8
AGA-3
American Gas Association
Landfill gas monitoring
NX-19

Notes and references

External links
http://www.sgc-valid8.com -- Free online Flow Measurement Calculation and Verification Engine
https://web.archive.org/web/20080828212148/http://www.squinch.org/gas.html -- Provides working hands-on examples of AGA 3 (orifice meters), AGA 7 (turbine meters) and AGA 8 (compressibility) gas flow calculations.
http://www.aga.org/ -- website for American Gas Association, publisher of AGA report no. 3 (Orifice Meters), report no. 7 (Measurement of Natural Gas by Turbine Meter) and report no. 8 (Compressibility Factor of Natural Gas and Related Hydrocarbon Gases)
http://www.api.org/ -- website for American Petroleum Institute website, publisher of the Manual of Petroleum Measurement Standards (MPMS), a compendium of petroleum gas and liquid measurement specifications.  Chapter 21 of the MPMS specifies an industry standard for electronic flow measurement.

Control devices
Embedded systems